Humba cyanicollis is a species of beetles belonging to the family Chrysomelidae.

Description
Humba cyanicollis can reach a length of about 14 mm and a width of about 8 mm. Body is oblong and convex. Pronotum is black-bluish, while elytrae are yellowish or orange.

Distribution and habitat
This species of beetles has an Indian distribution. They mainly live in the Himalayan mountains (Nepal, Darjiling and Sikkim).

References
 Biolib
 Global Names
 Es.convdocs
 Archive.org

Chrysomelinae
Beetles described in 1831